Odd Man Out is a 1947 British film noir directed by Carol Reed, and starring James Mason, Robert Newton, Cyril Cusack, and Kathleen Ryan. Set in Belfast, Northern Ireland, it follows a wounded Nationalist leader who attempts to evade police in the aftermath of a robbery. It is based on the 1945 novel of the same name by F. L. Green. 

The film received the first BAFTA Award for Best British Film, and was also nominated for the Academy Award for Best Film Editing. Filmmaker Roman Polanski repeatedly cited Odd Man Out as his favourite film.

Odd Man Out follows the Mason character "on an anguished journey through the alleys of Belfast that visually presages Harry Lime's shadowy flight through the sewers of Vienna" in Reed's 1949 film The Third Man.

Plot
The setting is an unnamed Belfast.  Northern Ireland. Irish nationalist 'organisation' member Johnny McQueen has been hiding for six months, since his escape from prison, in a house occupied by Kathleen Sullivan (who has fallen in love with Johnny) and her grandmother. He is ordered to rob a mill but his seclusion makes his men question his fitness; his lieutenant Dennis offers to take his place, but Johnny turns him down.

Johnny, Nolan, and Murphy carry out the robbery, While fleeing, Johnny falls behind the others and is tackled by an armed guard, whom he kills. Johnny is shot in the shoulder. He is pulled into the car, but falls out. Pat, the getaway driver, refuses to return to retrieve him. Weak and disorientated, Johnny hides in a nearby air raid shelter.

After telling Dennis what happened, Nolan, Murphy and Pat leave for "headquarters." On the way they are seen by police and pursued. Pat and Nolan stop off at Theresa O'Brien's well-to-do guest house, but Murphy does not trust her and goes elsewhere. Theresa betrays Pat and Nolan, who are killed in a gunfight with police.

Dennis finds Johnny, but the police show up nearby. Dennis is captured after drawing them away.

Johnny makes his way toward Kathleen's place, but collapses in the street. Passers-by Maureen and Maudie take him home, thinking he has been struck by a passing lorry. They attempt to give first-aid then see it is a gunshot wound, realising who they have found as the husband returns. An argument over what to do starts, Johnny hears their debate and departs, getting into a parked hansom cab. "Gin" Jimmy, the cab driver, comes out and starts looking for a fare, unaware he already has a wanted man for a passenger. When he finds out, he abandons Johnny in a vacant lot.

Shell spots him dumping the now nearly unconscious fugitive. He goes to Catholic priest Father Tom, hoping for a financial reward. Kathleen arrives shortly afterward, looking for help. Father Tom persuades Shell to fetch Johnny. Upon returning home, Shell has to fend off another resident, the eccentric painter Lukey, who wants him to pose for a portrait again; an argument starts between them. Meanwhile, Johnny revives and stumbles into a local pub where he is recognised by the landlord, who quickly deposits Johnny in a snug where no one else will see him, with the intention of getting rid of him later. Shell and Lukey who separately have converged on the bar start a fight with each other. Fencie breaks it up, closes for the evening, and persuades Lukey to take Johnny away as compensation for the damage he caused the pub. Lukey takes Johnny back to his studio to paint his portrait. Failed medical student Tober tends to Johnny's wound, and he flees.

Kathleen slips away from Father Tom during the visit to the rectory by a police inspector hunting for Johnny. She arranges passage on a ship for Johnny and goes searching for him. Shell starts Johnny toward Father Tom's, and Johnny encounters Kathleen. She takes Johnny toward the ship but sees the police closing in. She draws a gun and fires twice. The police return fire killing them both.

Cast

Production

Development
F.L.  Green's novel, also used as the basis of the 1969 Sidney Poitier film The Lost Man, was published in 1945. It followed upon wartime action by the IRA in Belfast, in consequence of which Northern Ireland undertook its first and only execution of an Irish Republican, 19-year-old Tom Williams. In the novel, an IRA plot goes horribly wrong when its leader, Johnny Murtah, kills an innocent man, and he is gravely wounded. The source of Green's familiarity with the Belfast IRA at the time is thought to be the Belfast writer Denis Ireland. Ireland's anti-Partition Ulster Union Club had been infiltrated by the IRA intelligence officer and recruiter John Graham.

Casting
According to Richard Burton, the lead role was originally offered to Stewart Granger. Burton wrote in his diaries:
Reminds me of Jimmy Granger being sent the script of Odd Man Out by Carol Reed and flipping through the pages where he had dialogue, deciding that the part wasn't long enough. He didn't notice the stage directions so turned it down and James Mason played it instead and made a career out of it. It's probably the best thing that Mason has ever done and certainly the best film he's ever been in while poor Granger has never been in a good classic film at all. Or, as far as I remember, in a good film of any kind. You could after all have a 'James Mason Festival' but you couldn't have a 'Stewart Granger' one. Except as a joke. Granger tells the story ruefully against himself.
Aside from Mason, the supporting cast was drawn largely from Dublin's Abbey Theatre. Among the other members of the Organisation are Cyril Cusack, Robert Beatty, and Dan O'Herlihy. On his travels, Johnny meets an opportunistic bird-fancier played by F. J. McCormick, a drunken artist played by Robert Newton, a barman (William Hartnell) and a failed surgeon (Elwyn Brook-Jones). Denis O'Dea is the inspector on Johnny's trail, and Kathleen Ryan, in her first feature film, plays the woman who loves Johnny. Also notable are W. G. Fay—a founder of the Abbey Theatre—as the kindly Father Tom, Fay Compton, Joseph Tomelty, and Eddie Byrne. Albert Sharpe plays a bus conductor. A number of non-speaking parts were filled by actors who later achieved public attention, including Dora Bryan, Geoffrey Keen, Noel Purcell, Guy Rolfe and Wilfrid Brambell (a standing passenger in the tram scene). Few of the main actors in the film actually manage an authentic Ulster accent.

Filming
The cinematographer was Robert Krasker, in his first film for director Reed, lighting sets designed by Ralph Brinton and Roger Furse. Reed made extensive use of location filming, which was uncommon at the time. Exterior scenes were shot in West Belfast, although some were shot at Broadway Market in London.

The bar set was based on the Crown Bar in Belfast but was a studio set built at D&P Studios in Denham, Buckinghamshire. The duplication was so authentic that tourists in subsequent years would visit the Crown Bar, thinking it was the bar in the film. To further enhance the realism of the film, Reed used real sounds instead of standard sound effects, recording the "actual drum of mill machinery and the echo of hoof beats." The narrowness of Johnny's world is represented by scenes shot on location in small rooms and in alleys. 

The film went over budget and overschedule so although it was successful it hurt Reed's relationship with the Rank Organisation.

Music
Composer William Alwyn was involved writing the leitmotif-based film score from the very beginning of the production. It was performed by the London Symphony Orchestra and conducted by Muir Mathieson.

Political context and censorship 
The film did not mention the IRA by name and, like John Ford's The Informer (1935), only "casually touched on the underlying conflict." Both use the backdrop of The Troubles to present morality tales designed to appeal to the broadest possible audience. The IRA was portrayed as little more than a criminal gang. Politics and the cause of Irish nationalism was avoided to "circumvent controversy and pass the censors."

With an eye toward distribution of the film in the United States, the film script was submitted to Joseph Breen of the Motion Picture Producers and Distributors of America, who advised the producers that the original ending, a murder-suicide, violated the Hollywood Production Code. Years earlier, Breen had similarly submitted the script of The Informer to the British Board of Film Censors, which requested numerous changes to omit references to the Anglo-Irish conflict.

Odd Man Out and The Informer are also similar in being "dramatic portrayals of lapsed Catholics rediscovering their lost faith," and "end with their dying protagonists assuming Christ-like poses."

Writing in The IRA on Film and Television: A History, author Mark Connelly observes that Johnny is "more of a mob boss than revolutionary," and that the F.L. Green novel upon which the film was based took a dim view of Irish nationalism.

Reception

Critics
Odd Man Out was "hailed as a masterpiece by many critics and a box office hit—at least in Europe, where Reed had gauged the mood of postwar despondency with caliper-like accuracy."

New York Times film critic Bosley Crowther praised the performances and the plotting of the early sequences in the film, which he compared favorably to The Informer, but he criticized the subsequent portions of the film, which he described as "fumbled" by shifting attention away from Mason and his motivations to "cryptic characters," relieving the protagonist of his illustrative role, and "whatever it is they are proving—if anything—is anybody's guess."

The Monthly Film Bulletin wrote "This film puts Reed high in the first rank of directors."

Box office
It ranked eighth among more popular movies at the British box office in 1947, and was one of the most successful films ever shown in South America.

Awards
The film received the BAFTA Award for Best British Film in 1948. It was nominated for the Golden Lion award at the Venice Film Festival in 1947, and nominated for a Best Film Editing Oscar in 1948.

Legacy
Carol Reed biographer Robert F. Moss notes that Odd Man Out is "almost indisputably Reed's masterpiece."

Filmmaker Roman Polanski repeatedly has cited Odd Man Out as his favourite film. Polanski stated that Odd Man Out is superior to The Third Man, another film that has been considered to be Reed's masterpiece:

Sam Peckinpah also cited it as a personal favorite.

American novelist, essayist and some-time screenwriter Gore Vidal called the film a "near-perfect film" and its screenwriter R. C. Sherriff "one of the few true film auteurs."

Writing in 2006, Guardian film critic Peter Bradshaw gave the film three out of five stars. He wrote that the film was a "fascinating but imperfect thriller" that reflected "Belfast's forgotten identity as a bustling, prosperous provincial city, not obviously shattered by sectarianism or terrorism: a city in which a packed tram can head for the Falls Road, without any visible sense of fear."

Leonard Maltin gave the movie 4 out of 4 stars naming it "Incredibly suspenseful."

Radio adaptation
Odd Man Out was presented on Suspense 11 February 1952. James Mason and his wife Pamela Mason starred in the 30-minute adaptation.

References

Sources
 
  
 
 Jerry Vermilye The Great British Films, Citadel Press, 1978, pp. 106–109

External links
 
 
 
 
 Odd Man Out at BFI Screenonline
 Odd Man Out radio adaptation at Suspense on 11 February 1952 with James Mason and Pamela Kellino
 Odd Man Out: Death and the City an essay by Imogen Sara Smith at the Criterion Collection

1947 drama films
1947 films
Abbey Theatre
British chase films
Film noir
Films based on British novels
Films directed by Carol Reed
Films set in Northern Ireland
Films shot in Northern Ireland
Two Cities Films films
British drama films
Best British Film BAFTA Award winners
Films scored by William Alwyn
Irish Republican Army (1922–1969)
British black-and-white films
1940s English-language films
1940s British films